Retablo is a 2017 Peruvian drama film directed by Alvaro Delgado-Aparicio. The film is an international production with the participation of Peru, Germany and Norway. The cast also includes Magaly Solier as Anatolia, Segundo's mother and Noé's wife.  Delgado-Aparicio's full-length directorial debut, the film is written and acted in Ayacucho Quechua.

Plot
The film follows Segundo (Junior Bejar Roca), a young boy in Ayacucho in rural Peru whose father Noé (Amiel Cayo) is training him in the family tradition of designing and building religious retablos, but whose secret shatters Segundo's world and everything he believes in.

Release
The film premiered at the 2017 Festival de Cine de Lima, where it won the award for Best Peruvian Film. It had its international premiere at the 2018 Berlin International Film Festival, where it won a Teddy Award as the best LGBTQ-themed debut film of the festival. In 2019 it won the Havana Star Prize for Best Film (Fiction) at the 20th Havana Film Festival New York.

It was selected as the Peruvian entry for the Best International Feature Film at the 92nd Academy Awards, but it was not nominated.

See also
 List of submissions to the 92nd Academy Awards for Best International Feature Film
 List of Peruvian submissions for the Academy Award for Best International Feature Film

References

External links
 

2017 films
2017 drama films
2017 LGBT-related films
Peruvian drama films
Peruvian LGBT-related films
2010s Peruvian films
Quechua-language films
LGBT-related drama films